Doris Pawn (born Doris Alice Pahn; December 29, 1894 – March 30, 1988) was an American silent era film actress.

Early life
Pahn was born on December 29, 1894, to Louise Marie Hasse (1867–1925) and Martin Pahn. She had three sisters and one brother. Born and raised in Norfolk, Nebraska, she spent her vacations on the ranch of an uncle. There, she learned to ride horseback and rode Indian saddle as a teen. She entered a business college to prepare for life as a typist. She came to California with her mother and brother and stayed in San Diego, California while her family returned east.

Pawn eventually met director Wilfred Lucas. She was offered work as a fill in in the film Trey of Hearts (1914), while the company was on location in San Diego. So impressed were the filmmakers that she was offered additional work if she came along to Los Angeles, California. Pawn worked for a period of three months as an extra.

Career
Director Sydney Ayres coveted Pawn as a leading lady early in her screen career. In 1916, she appeared in her first Fox Film feature, Blue Blood and Red, directed by Raoul Walsh. Studios were impressed with her personal charm and ability to act naturally. She was especially gifted in the art of pantomime.

In addition to Fox, Pawn made movies with Universal, Goldwyn, and Paramount Pictures. She returned to Fox in 1921 for the making of Shame. She starred alongside John Gilbert and Anna May Wong. Her final films were two dramas, Fools and Riches and The Hero, along with a western, The Buster. Each of these productions was released in 1923.

Personal life
Pawn was first married to director Rex Ingram, but that union ended in divorce. She married secondly to Paul Reiners in 1928. Her last marriage was to Samuel William Dunaway in 1937; the couple remained married until his death in 1969. She had no children.

Death
Pawn died in La Jolla, California in 1988, aged 93.

Selected filmography
The Trey o' Hearts (1914)
 Blue Blood and Red (1916)
 Little Eve Edgarton (1916)
 The Book Agent (1917)
 Some Boy! (1917)
The City of Dim Faces (1918)
Toby's Bow (1919)
The Beloved Cheater (1919)
The Penalty (1920)
Li Ting Lang (1920)
The Strange Boarder (1920)
Out of the Storm (1920)
What Happened to Rosa (1920)
Shame (1921)
A Midnight Bell (1921)
Guile of Women (1921)
 Fightin' Mad (1921)
 The Millionaire (1921)
Cheated Hearts (1921)
Always the Woman (1922)
Strange Idols (1922)
 One Clear Call (1922)
 Fools and Riches (1923)
The Buster (1923) 
 The Hero (1923)

References

Janesville, Wisconsin Daily Gazette, News Notes From Movieland, Thursday, July 19, 1917, p. 6.
Lincoln, Nebraska Sunday State Journal, On The Silver Screen, March 23, 1924, p. 15.
 The Madison, Wisconsin Capitol Times, News Notes From Movieland, December 30, 1921, p. 14.

External links

portrait of Doris Pawn late 1910s or early 1920s circa 1935

20th-century American actresses
American film actresses
American silent film actresses
Western (genre) film actresses
Actresses from Nebraska
1894 births
1988 deaths
People from Norfolk, Nebraska